Multiple United States Navy ships have been named USS Crown Point, for the Battle of Crown Point, but all have been renamed before entering service:

United States Navy ship names